The 1951 Men's European Volleyball Championship, the third edition of the event, was organized by Europe's governing volleyball body, the Confédération Européenne de Volleyball. It was hosted in Paris, France from September 12 to September 22, 1951.

Teams

First round
The top two teams in each pool will qualify for the final round.

Pool A

|}

|}

Pool B

|}

|}

Pool C

|}

|}

Final round

Placement group 1st - 6th

|}

Placement group 7th - 10th

|}

Final ranking

References
 CEV
 Results
 Results (Archived 2009-07-21)

Mens European Volleyball Championship, 1951
Men's European Volleyball Championship
Men's European Volleyball Championship
International volleyball competitions hosted by France